Anchor Bay High School is a four-year secondary school located in Fair Haven, Michigan (St. Clair County), and it is part of the Anchor Bay School District.

History 
The former high school in Chesterfield Township was converted to a middle school when the new high school opened at the beginning of the 2003-04 school year.

Demographics
The demographic breakdown of the 1,938 students enrolled in 2014-15 was:
Male - 49.6%
Female - 50.4%
Native American/Alaskan - 0.1%
Asian/Pacific islanders - 0.9%
Black - 3.4%
Hispanic - 2.5%
White - 89.7%
Multiracial - 3.4%

23.9% of the students were eligible for free or reduced lunch.

Athletics
The Anchor Bay Tars compete in the Macomb Area Conference.  The school colors are red and white.  The following MHSAA sanctioned sports are offered:

Baseball (boys)
Basketball (girls and boys)
Bowling (girls and boys)
Competitive Cheer (girls)
Cross Country (girls and boys)
Football (boys)
Golf (boys)
Ice hockey (boys)
Lacrosse (boys)
Soccer (girls and boys)
Softball (girls)
Swim and dive (girls and boys)
Tennis (girls and boys)
Track and field (girls and boys)
Volleyball (girls)
Wrestling (boys)

Notable alumni
 Butch Hartman, cartoon animator
 Greg Janicki, professional soccer player
Taiwan Jones, NFL linebacker
Anthony Misiewicz, MLB pitcher
 Ken Pavés, celebrity hair stylist
Kathleen Rose Perkins, actress

References

External links
 Anchor Bay High School Official website

Public high schools in Michigan
Schools in Macomb County, Michigan
2003 establishments in Michigan